Lucian Nethsingha (3 May 1936 - 12 February 2021) was a British cathedral organist born in Ceylon who served as the Organist of Exeter Cathedral.

Background
Lucian Nethsingha was born in Colombo, Ceylon, and educated at St. Thomas' College, Colombo. In 1954, he went to the Royal College of Music and studied with Ralph Downes and Herbert Howells.

He then studied music at King's College, Cambridge, with Boris Ord and David Willcocks.

Career
Organist of:
St. Michael's College, Tenbury (1959–1973)
Exeter Cathedral (1973–1999)

Personal life
He married Jane, who predeceased him in 2015. His son, Andrew, is also an organist. Lucian Nethsingha died in February 2021, aged 84.

References

1936 births
2021 deaths
English classical organists
British male organists
Cathedral organists
Alumni of King's College, Cambridge
Alumni of the Royal College of Music
21st-century organists
21st-century British male musicians
Sri Lankan emigrants to the United Kingdom
Male classical organists